General elections were held in Jamaica on 21 February 1967. The result was a victory for the Jamaica Labour Party, which won 33 of the 53 seats. Voter turnout was 82.2%.

Results

References

1967 in Jamaica
Elections in Jamaica
Jamaica